Second Live Concert: The Great is the second live album of South Korean boy band Big Bang, released by YG Entertainment on February 27, 2008. This album was recorded during BigBang's tour The G.R.E.A.T which was held at the Seoul Olympic Park in South Korea, from December 28 to 30, 2007.

Track listing

Notes
"Crazy Dog + You, in the Fantasy" is a medley that it includes BigBang's "Crazy Dog" and Seo Taiji & Boys' "You, in the Fantasy".
"Wild Wild West" is a mixed cover as it contains BigBang's "How Gee" lyrics and Will Smith's "Wild Wild West" music and lyrics.

Charts

References

External links 
 Big Bang Official Site

BigBang (South Korean band) live albums
2008 live albums
YG Entertainment live albums
Korean-language live albums